Dawn Sweeney was the President & CEO of the National Restaurant Association.

She is a Maine native with a Master of Business Administration degree from The George Washington University and a Bachelor of Arts degree in government from Colby College in Waterville, Maine.

Background
Sweeney was named the first female president and CEO of the National Restaurant Association in 2007. In May 2019, Sweeney announced she would retire from her position at the National Restaurant Association at the end of 2019. An accomplished executive with a proactive, nonpartisan approach, she has generated positive reviews from the industry and in Washington.

At the National Restaurant Association, she led the organization's mission to help its members "build customer loyalty, rewarding careers and financial success" and "lead America's restaurant industry into a new era of prosperity, prominence and participation, enhancing the quality of life for all we serve". She also serves as the CEO of the National Restaurant Association's Educational Foundation.

Before joining the National Restaurant Association, Sweeney was the president and CEO of AARP Services, the wholly owned taxable subsidiary of AARP, where she was responsible for the launch of AARP Financial, which offers financial planning services and products. She also more than quadrupled revenues for the organization that were used to support AARP's mission.

Before taking the helm at AARP Services, Sweeney was AARP's Group Executive Officer for Membership, where she launched the association's Hispanic membership development initiatives and oversaw AARP The Magazine, which is read by more than 20 million people. Prior to that, she held positions at the National Rural Electric Cooperative Association and the International Dairy Foods Association.

Recognition and service
Pennsylvania State University School of Hospitality Management named Dawn Sweeney as their spring 2015 Conti professor.

CEO Update magazine named Sweeney one of the top association CEOs in the U.S. in 2009.

Irish America magazine selected her in 2007 as one of its 100 honorees, and she was also recently inducted into the Honor Society of the American Culinary Federation's American Academy of Chefs.

Sweeney serves on the board of Save the Children, a global organization committed to creating lasting change in the lives of children in need.

She is an active member of the United States Chamber of Commerce's Committee of 100, the International Women's Forum, and the Committee of 200, an international network of female executives.

References

External links
 National Restaurant Association President & CEO Dawn Sweeney bio

American food industry business executives
Living people
Colby College alumni
Year of birth missing (living people)